General elections were held on the Isle of Man on Thursday, 23 November 2006. The voting age was lowered to 16 at this election. As usual, the election was dominated by independents, who took 21 of the 24 seats.

Background
In the previous elections in 2001, independents won 22 out of the 24 seats and the Manx Labour Party won two seats.

Results

By constituency
The winners in bold. Several constituencies have more than one member elected.

References

Elections in the Isle of Man
Isle of Man
General election
Isle of Man
Isle of Man